Eleocharis caespitosissima is a sedge of the family Cyperaceae that is native to Australia.

It blooms between May and August.

It is found submerged in and around rivers and swampy areas in the Kimberley region of Western Australia where it grows in sandy to clay soils.

References

Plants described in 1885
Flora of Western Australia
caespitosissima
Taxa named by John Gilbert Baker